Erika Abril Suárez (born March 29, 1978 in San José de Pare, Boyacá) is a Colombian long-distance runner. She competed in the marathon at the 2012 Summer Olympics, placing 51st with a time of 2:33:33, a Colombian national record.

Personal bests
Half marathon: 1:13:14 hrs –  São Paulo, 5 March 2012
Marathon: 2:33:33 hrs –  London, 5 August 2012

Achievements

References

External links

Sports reference biography
Tilastopaja biography

1978 births
Living people
Sportspeople from Boyacá Department
Colombian female long-distance runners
Olympic athletes of Colombia
Athletes (track and field) at the 2012 Summer Olympics
Athletes (track and field) at the 2016 Summer Olympics
Colombian female marathon runners
21st-century Colombian women